Aladdin4D is a computer program for modeling and rendering three-dimensional graphics and animations, currently running on AmigaOS and macOS platforms. A-EON Technology Ltd owns the rights and develops current and future versions of Aladdin4D for AmigaOS, MorphOS & AROS. All other platforms including macOS, iPadOS, iOS, Linux & Windows are developed by DiscreetFX.

History

Aladdin4D was originally created by Greg Gorby at Adspec Programming in Ohio, and was an updated version of an earlier 3D program called Draw4D Pro, which integrated elements of desktop publishing into its environment. In 1996, the 3D program was then acquired and updated by Nova Design, Inc. Nova Design added many modern features and made it easier to use. It was one of the first 3D animation programs on any platform to employ volumetrics, which were primarily used to create volumetric gas. However, unlike the majority of Amiga 3D programs, it used scanline rendering instead of the more photo-realistic ray tracing technique. Scanline rendering is similar to the rendering technique used in most Pixar movies.

On December 17, 2007, Nova Design sold all inventory, source code and intellectual property rights to DiscreetFX LLC. DiscreetFX is developing a new 6.0 version for Mac OS X, iPad, Android & Linux.

On December 12, 2014, DiscreetFX sold the AmigaOS source code and development rights for Aladdin4D on AmigaOS, MorphOS & AROS platforms to A-EON Technology Ltd. DiscreetFX retains the rights to other non-Amiga platforms.

Features

This software was one of the few 3D applications for AmigaOS, and not just the Amiga platform--in the sense that it uses an OS-compliant GUI, supports RTG displays, utilizes the AmigaGuide Help system and features an ARexx port for scripting. Concerning the 3D features of the application:

 Infinite layering of surfaces: A surface of an object may have a virtually infinite amount of textures, shaders etc. layered on it.
 Spline modelling tool.
 Importing of most postscript files, making the creation of logos easier.
 Unlimited number of working layers: multiple working areas containing only a portion of the scene, easing out the management and pace of objects during the creation of animation.
 Gaseous volumetrics with adjustable mass.
 Built-in particle system to simulate various effects like fireworks.
 Morphing capabilities in the animation system.
 Spline animation controls.

Also, Aladdin4D has rendering features like motion blur, multiple pass supersampling, lens flares, 32-bit color support and a highly optimized 68k rendering engine.

Format support

Aladdin4D supports the following 3D formats: Aladdin 4D, LightWave 3D, GEO, EPS, DEM, Draw4D-Pro and Draw4D, 3D Studio for either loading or loading and saving. Image formats supported for loading and saving: IFF/ILBM (palette mapped and 24-bit formats), JPEG and Video Toaster Framestores. Aladdin 4D was one of the first rendering/animation packages to support video editing/post production hardware on any computer platform (NewTek's Video Toaster/Flyer).

Interoperability

Aladdin4D 5.x supports exchange of data with ImageFX, Amiga Lightwave 3D/Video Toaster, World Construction Set and all programs that support Nova Design's "Magic" protocol for buffer sharing.

Versions
 1991 Draw4D Pro
 1992 Aladdin 4D 2.0
 1993 Aladdin 4D 3.0
 1995 Aladdin 4D 4.0
 1997 Aladdin 4D 5.0
 2011 Aladdin4D 6.0 Internal Beta
 2014 Aladdin4D 6.0 AROS Stable Release 6.0.0.27 (Internal Beta) / February 2nd, 2014

See also

Amiga Reflections
LightWave 3D
Cinema 4D
Imagine
Pixar RenderMan
Caligari

References

External links
Aladdin 4D - 3D Animation Packages website.
CU Amiga Magazine November 1997 - Magazine cover created with Aladdin 4D.
Amiga News Site Report from December 12th 2014 - Mainstream Amiga news site Amiga.org reports about Aladdin4D IP sale of AmigaOS, MorphOS & AROS versions. 

Amiga
Amiga raytracers
3D graphics software
AmigaOS 4 software
3D animation software
MorphOS software
Amiga software